Khvostov or Hvostov (from хвост meaning tail) is a Russian masculine surname, its feminine counterpart is Khvostova or Hvostova. It may refer to:
Alexander Khvostenko-Khvostov (1895–1967), Ukrainian avant-garde artist
Aleksandr Khvostov (1857–1922), Russian politician
Aleksey Khvostov (1872–1918), Russian statesman and politician
Dmitry Khvostov (1757–1835), Russian poet
Dmitry Khvostov (basketball) (born 1989), Russian basketball player
Evgeny Khvostov (born 1981), Russian ice hockey defenceman
Mikhail Khvostov (born 1949), Belarusian ambassador

Russian-language surnames